Brian T. Kennedy (April 11, 1934 – March 21, 2012) was an American politician who served two terms in the New Jersey General Assembly from 1972 to 1974 and 1976 to 1978 and two terms in the New Jersey Senate from 1978 to 1984.

A resident of Manasquan, New Jersey, he died on March 21, 2012, at age 77.

References

1934 births
2012 deaths
People from Manasquan, New Jersey
Politicians from Monmouth County, New Jersey
Republican Party members of the New Jersey General Assembly
Republican Party New Jersey state senators